This is a list of football clubs in Romania that play in the main leagues for the 2022–2023 season.

SuperLiga
FC Arges
FC Botoșani
CFR Cluj
Chindia Târgoviște
 Farul Constanța
FCSB
FC Hermannstadt
CS Mioveni
Petrolul Ploiești
 Rapid București
Sepsi Sfântu Gheorghe
FC U Craiova 1948
Universitatea Craiova
 "U" Cluj
UTA Arad
FC Voluntari

Liga II
CSC 1599 Șelimbăr
 FC Brașov
Concordia Chiajna
 Csikszereda Miercurea Ciuc
 Dinamo 1948
CSC Dumbrăvița
 Gloria Buzău
 Metaloglobus
Minaur Baia Mare
Oțelul Galați
 Poli Iași
 Poli Timișoara
Progresul Spartac
 Ripensia Timișoara
 CSM Slatina
 CSA Steaua București
Unirea Constanța
Unirea Dej
Unirea Slobozia
 Viitorul Pandurii Tg. Jiu

Liga III

Seria I
 CSM Bacău
Bucovina Rădăuți
Ceahlăul Piatra Neamț
 Csikszereda II
Dante Botoșani
Foresta Suceava
 Rapid Brodoc
Șomuz Fălticeni
 Știința Miroslava
 Viitorul Darabani

Seria II
Aerostar Bacău
Dacia Unirea Brăila
Dinamo Bacău
CSM Focșani
Metalul Buzău
CSM Râmnicu Sărat
Sporting Liești
Viitorul Ianca
Voința Limpeziș
Unirea Braniștea

Seria III
CS Afumați
Agricola Borcea
CS Amara
Dunărea Călărași
 Farul Constanța II
Gloria Albești
Gloria Băneasa
Înainte Modelu 
Recolta Gheorghe Doja
FC Voluntari II

Seria IV
Astra Giurgiu
CS Dinamo București
 FCSB II
Flacăra Moreni
Muscelul Câmpulung Elite
SC Popești-Leordeni
FC Pucioasa
Real Bradu
Unirea Bascov
CS Tunari

Seria V
Kids Tâmpa Brașov
KSE Târgu Secuiesc
Odorheiu Secuiesc
Olimpic Cetate Râșnov
Olimpic Zărnești
CS Păulești
CSO Plopeni
 Sepsi OSK II
SR Brașov

Seria VI
CSM Alexandria
 Cetatea Turnu Măgurele
Cozia Călimănești
Flacăra Horezu
Minerul Costești
Petrolul Potcoava
Sporting Roșiori
 CS U Craiova II
Vedița Colonești
 Viitorul Dăești

Seria VII
Aurul Brad
CSM Deva
ACSO Filiași
Gilortul Târgu Cărbunești
Jiul Petroșani
Progresul Ezeriș
Retezatul Hațeg
 Viitorul Pandurii II
Viitorul Șimian
Voința Lupac

Seria VIII
ACB Ineu
Avântul Periam
Crișul Chișineu Criș
Gloria Lunca-Teuz Cermei
CSM Ghiroda și Giarmata Vii
Phoenix Buziaș
Pobeda Star Bisnov
Progresul Pecica
CSM Reșița
Șoimii Lipova

Seria IX
Avântul Reghin
Corvinul Hunedoara
Metalurgistul Cugir
CS Ogna Mureș
Sănătatea Cluj
ACS Târgu Mureș 1898
Unirea Alba Iulia
Unirea Ungheni
Universitatea Alba Iulia
Viitorul Cluj

Seria X
FC Bihor Oradea
 CFR Cluj II
 Gloria Bistrița-Năsăud
Lotus Băile Felix
Minerul Ocna Dej
CSM Satu Mare
CSM Sighetu Marmației
Sportul Șimleu Silvaniei
Victoria Carei
SCM Zalău

Liga IV

Liga IV - București
ACP 3 Kids Sport
Asalt București
 Daco-Getica
ACS FC Dinamo
Metaloglobus II
Pro Team
Progresul 2005
Rapid Frumoșii Nebuni ai Giuleștiului
Romprim București
Sportivii București
Sportul D&A
Știința București
Turistul București
Venus București

Liga IV - Argeș
 ARO Muscelul Câmpulung
ACS Bălilești
ACS Costești
DLR Pitești
CS Domnești
Energia Stolnici
International Valea Iașului
Juventus Bascov
 CS Mioveni II
Muscelul Câmpulung Elite II
Muscelul Lerești
ACS Poiana Lacului
Sola Gratia Dragoslavele
Speed Academy Pitești
CSC Sușeni
Victoria Buzoiești
Viitorul Birla
Viitorul Rucăr

Liga IV - Bacău
AS Barsanesti
Bradul Mănăstirea Cașin
CS Dofteana
CS Faraoani
AS Filipești
Flamura Roșie Sascut
Gauss Bacău
Măgura Cașin
Măgura Târgu Ocna
CSM Moinești
AS Negri
ASV Oituz
Rapid Bacău
Siretu Săucești
Sportul Onești
Unirea Bacău
UZU Darmanesti
Voința Brătești
Viitorul Berești-Tazlău
Viitorul Caiuți
Viitorul Curita
Viitorul Nicolae Bălcescu

Liga IV - Bihor
FC Bihor II
Bihorul Beiuș
Crișul Aleșd
Crișul Sântandrei
Diosig Bihardioszeg
Foresta Tileagd
Izvorul Cociuba Mare
CA Oradea
CS Oșorhei
 Lotus II
Luceafărul Oradea
Olimpia Salonta
Slovan Valea Cerului
Unirea Roșia
Unirea Valea lui Mihai
Universitatea Oradea
Vadu Crișului
Victoria Avram Iancu
Viitorul Borș
Viitorul Dobrești
Vulturii din Săcueni

Liga IV - Bistrița-Năsăud
AS Archiud
Atletico Monor
Dinamo Uriu
ACS Dumitra
Eciro Forest Telciu
Hebe Sîngeorz Băi
Heniu Lesu
Minerul Rodna
Progresul Năsăud
Real Teaca
Săgeata Dumbrăvița
Silvicultorul Maieru
Someșul Feldru
Someșul Reteag
Sportul Beclean
CS Valea Bârgăului
Viitorul Budești
Voința Marișelu
Voința Matei

Liga IV - Cluj
Arieșul Turda

Liga IV - Constanța
Axiopolis Cernavodă
CS Agigea
Farul Tuzla
CS Lumina
CS Medgidia
CS Năvodari
CSC Mihail Kogălniceanu
CSO Murfatlar
CSO Ovidiu
Portul Constanța
Poseidon Limanu
Sparta Techirghiol
Șoimii Topraisar
Știința Poarta Albă
Victoria Cumpăna
Viitorul Cobadin
Viitorul Hârșova
Viitorul Pecineaga

Liga IV - Giurgiu
Dunărea Giurgiu

Liga IV - Hunedoara
 Corvinul II
Dacia Orăștie
 CSM Deva II
Gloria Geoagiu
Inter Petrila
Mihai Viteazu Vulcan
Minerul Lupeni
Minerul Uricani
Șoimul Băița
Victoria Călan
Viitorul Șoimuș

Liga IV - Ialomița
 FC Urziceni
Viitorul Axintele

Liga IV - Ilfov
FC 1 Decembrie
ARD Snagov
CS Balotești
CS Brănești
CSO Bragadiru
CS Ciorogârla
Juniors Berceni
CS Glina
 LPS HD Clinceni
CS Măgurele
Olimpic Snagov
Stejarul Gruiu
CSL Ștefăneștii de Jos
 CS Tunari II
Viitorul Domnești
Viitorul Dragomirești Vale
Viitorul Pantelimon
Viitorul Petrăchioaia
Viitorul Vidra
Voința Buftea
Voința Domnești

Liga IV - Olt
FC Olt Scornicești

Liga IV - Sibiu
Petrolul 95
Tricolorul Breaza

Liga IV - Sibiu
 ACS Mediaș
LSS Voința Sibiu

Liga IV - Satu Mare
Olimpia Satu Mare

Liga IV - Timiș
CSM Lugoj
Unirea Sânnicolau Mare
Universitatea de Vest din Timișoara

See also
List of football clubs in Romania by county
 List of football stadiums in Romania
 Sport in Romania

External links
Liga I clubs at lpf.ro
Liga II at frf.ro
Liga III at frf.ro

 
Romania
clubs
Lists of organizations based in Romania